Nho Quan is a township and capital of Nho Quan District, Ninh Bình Province, Vietnam.

References

Populated places in Ninh Bình province
District capitals in Vietnam
Townships in Vietnam